Sarah Rose McDaniel  is an American model. She appeared in the music video for Mark Ronson and Kevin Parker's songs "Summer Breaking" and "Daffodils", and was the cover girl for Playboy magazine's first non-nude issue in March 2016.

Early life 
McDaniel was born in Roseville, California. Her parents are Angela McDaniel (née Chamberlin; born 1967), and Gregory Paul McDaniel (born 1965), a project manager.

Career 
McDaniel was on the cover of Playboy'''s first non-nude issue for March 2016.  She has also appeared as a guest on The Late Show with Stephen Colbert.

McDaniel has appeared in several music videos, first in the video for Mark Ronson's "Summer Breaking / Daffodils" featuring Kevin Parker. Her second appearance was for G-Eazy's single "Some Kind of Drug" featuring Marc E. Bassy. She made her acting debut in Edouard Pluvieux's series SuperHigh, starring alongside Kev Adams and DeStorm.

She has also done some work as a journalist. McDaniel wrote science-based entries on Filthy and Huffington Post''. Her blogs covered emotion-changing parasites, zombie fungus, and black holes.

Heterochromia 
McDaniel states that her heterochromia iridum appeared a few weeks after she was born, with her right eye brown and her left eye blue. She has stated in interviews that a previous agent and different modeling companies wanted to have her wear colored contacts in an effort to focus more on the design, and McDaniel highlights social media for her embracing her look.

However, McDaniel's father has come out with statements saying her heterochromia iridium is fake. McDaniel insists that she does have heterochromia and has been "devastated by the accusation" and the online abuse she has received. Photographs of McDaniel's posted online (including some by her father) "seemed to show the color of McDaniel’s blue eye changing, from blue-green dappled with brown, turquoise with a brown ring around the pupil, to solid aquamarine with a black ring at the perimeter".

References

External links 

McDaniel's author profile at vocal.media

1990s births
Female models from California
Living people
People from Roseville, California
21st-century American journalists
American women journalists
21st-century American women